The Juneau County Courthouse, located at 220 E. State St. in Mauston, Wisconsin, was built with Works Project Administration assistance. 

It was listed on the National Register of Historic Places in 1982.  It was designed in Moderne style by architects Hougen & Henderson.

A foundation stone indicates the year 1939; it was completed in 1941.  It is a three-story building built on a raised basement, with setbacks as it rises, and is in plan at its base.

It was built in two stages:  first an "addition" started in 1938 to a pre-existing courthouse, then a second unit built over the razed pre-existing building.

References

Courthouses on the National Register of Historic Places in Wisconsin
Moderne architecture in the United States
Government buildings completed in 1941
Juneau County, Wisconsin
Works Progress Administration in Wisconsin